The men's javelin throw event at the 2004 World Junior Championships in Athletics was held in Grosseto, Italy, at Stadio Olimpico Carlo Zecchini on 14 and 16 July.

Medalists

Results

Final
16 July

Qualifications
14 July

Group A

Group B

Participation
According to an unofficial count, 25 athletes from 21 countries participated in the event.

References

Javelin throw
Javelin throw at the World Athletics U20 Championships